Mikhail Vladimirovich Razvozhayev (Russian: Михаил Владимирович Развожаев; born 30 December 1980) is a Russian statesman and politician. He is currently the internationally non-recognized Governor of Sevastopol since 2 October 2020. He served as the Secretary of the Sevastopol Regional Branch of the United Russia Party since October 25, 2019. Razvozhayev had served as the acting Head of the Republic of Khakassia from October 3 to November 15, 2018. He also worked as the Deputy Minister of the Russian Federation for North Caucasus Affairs from October 1, 2014 to October 3, 2018. He also served as the head of the Executive Committee of the All-Russian Popular Front, member of the Central Head of ONF from December 17, 2018 to July 11, 2019.

Biography
Mikhail Razvozhayev was born in Krasnoyarsk on 30 December 1980.

In 2002, he graduated from the historical faculty of the Krasnoyarsk State Pedagogical University.

He began his career while studying at the university in February 2002 in the trade union organization of students of the Krasnoyarsk State Pedagogical University.

From April 2003 to October 2008 he replaced the posts of the state civil service in the Administration of the Governor of the Krasnoyarsk Krai.

Since October 2008, he has held senior positions in the administration of the Governor of the Krasnoyarsk Krai with Alexander Khloponin and since 2010, Lev Kuznetsov.

From August 2012 to July 2014 he was deputy head of the administration of the governor of the Krasnoyarsk Krai from May 2014. Viktor Tolokonsky was acting as governor at the time.

From July to October 2014, he served as adviser to the Minister of the Russian Federation for Northern Caucasus Affairs with Kuznetsov.

Since 1  October 2014, he was promoted as the Deputy Minister of the Russian Federation for North Caucasus Affairs. He was trained in the first stream of the Higher School of Public Administration of the Russian Academy of National Economy and Public Administration under the President of the Russian Federation., created by order of the Academy No. 02-573 of 19 November 2013.

In 2018, he graduated from the Development Program for the Personnel Management Reserve.

On 3 October 2018, Russian President Vladimir Putin appointed Razvozhayev as the interim head of the Republic of Khakassia after the resignation of Viktor Zimin, who failed to win the first round of elections on September 9 and refused to continue the fight. Almost immediately after the appointment, he promised to resolve the personal conflict of two candidates for governors – participants in the second round of elections:, Communist Party representative Valentin Konovalov, and Aleksandr Myakhar from the Party of Growth.

On the air of the Russia 1 television channel,  Razvozhaev asked the republic's election commission to withdraw the lawsuit from the Supreme Court of Khakassia to unregister the candidate for governor from Konovalov.

On 27 October 2018, Razvozhaev announced that he would be ready to go to new elections if the round scheduled for 11 November was declared invalid. However, residents of the republic voted for the deputy of the Abakan City Council from the Communist Party and elected Konovalov as the Head of the Republic of Khakassia.

On November 29, 2018, Razvozhayev was elected to the Central Headquarters of the All-Russian Popular Front.

From December 17, 2018 to July 2019, he was the head of the executive committee of the All-Russian Popular Front.

Governor of Sevastopol
On July 11, 2019, with Putin's decree, Razvozhayev was appointed as the interim Governor of Sevastopol. Previously, this post was held by Dmitry Ovsyannikov, who resigned at his own request

Direct elections of the head of the region will be held on September 13, 2020

12 July 2019 Razvozhayev dismissed the Government of Sevastopol. The Government will continue its work until the formation of a new Government.

On September 30, 2019 Razvozhayev formed the new composition of the Government of Sevastopol. The government included seven deputy governors: Vladimir Bazarov, Aleksander Kulagin, Maria Litovko, Aleksey Parikin, Svetlana Pirogova, Denis Solodovnikov, and the ex-Senator of the Federation Council from Sevastopol Olga Timofeyeva.

On 25 October 2019 at the conference of the party "United Russia", Razvozhayev was approved as secretary of the Sevastopol regional branch. This decision was supported by the majority at the party conference of the Sevastopol branch of the party.

Family
Razvozhayev is married, and has two children.

References

1980 births
Living people
United Russia politicians
Politicians from Krasnoyarsk
Russian Presidential Academy of National Economy and Public Administration alumni